Amir Durgutović (born 12 January 1968) is a Bosnian retired professional footballer and former football manager.

Playing career
Durgutović played for Borac Banja Luka and Sutjeska Nikšić in Yugoslavia, and had a brief spell with Adanaspor in the Turkish Süper Lig. He finished his career playing with Zvijezda Gradačac in 1997. Durgutović played for Borac in the 1987–88 Yugoslav Cup final win over Red Star Belgrade.

Managerial career
On 25 September 2009, Durgutović became the new manager of Zvijezda Gradačac. He stayed on that position until 20 December of that same year, winning 3, drawing 1 and losing 4 games.

Managerial statistics

Honours

Player
Borac Banja Luka
Yugoslav Cup: 1987–88

References

External links

1968 births
Living people
Sportspeople from Tuzla
Association football forwards
Yugoslav footballers
Bosnia and Herzegovina footballers
FK Borac Banja Luka players
FK Sutjeska Nikšić players
Adanaspor footballers
NK Zvijezda Gradačac players
Yugoslav First League players
Süper Lig players
First League of the Federation of Bosnia and Herzegovina players
Yugoslav expatriate footballers
Expatriate footballers in Turkey
Yugoslav expatriate sportspeople in Turkey
Bosnia and Herzegovina football managers
NK Zvijezda Gradačac managers
Premier League of Bosnia and Herzegovina managers